The 1989 NCAA Division I Men's Swimming and Diving Championships were contested in March 1989 at the Indiana University Natatorium in Indianapolis, Indiana at the 66th annual NCAA-sanctioned swim meet to determine the team and individual national champions of Division I men's collegiate swimming and diving in the United States. The men's and women's titles would not be held at the same site until 2006.

Texas again topped the team standings, finishing 79 points ahead of Stanford. It was the Longhorns' second consecutive and third overall title and the third for coach Eddie Reese.

Team standings
Note: Top 10 only
(H) = Hosts
(DC) = Defending champions
Full results

See also
List of college swimming and diving teams

References

NCAA Division I Men's Swimming and Diving Championships
NCAA Division I Men's Swimming And Diving Championships
NCAA Division I Men's Swimming And Diving Championships
NCAA Division I Men's Swimming and Diving Championships